Tetragona is a genus of bees belonging to the family Apidae.

The species of this genus are found in Southern America.

Species:

Tetragona beebei 
Tetragona clavipes 
Tetragona dissecta 
Tetragona dorsalis 
Tetragona essequiboensis 
Tetragona goettei 
Tetragona handlirschii 
Tetragona kaieteurensis 
Tetragona mayarum 
Tetragona perangulata 
Tetragona quadrangula 
Tetragona truncata 
Tetragona ziegleri

References

Meliponini